Alfred Jermaniš (born 21 January 1967) is a retired Slovenian football midfielder.

Jermaniš played in Slovenia, Japan, Austria and Cyprus. He won the Slovenian PrvaLiga title in 1991–92 with Olimpija and in 1995–96 with Gorica.

Jermaniš was capped 29 times and scored 1 goal for the Slovenian national team between 1992 and 1998.

See also
Slovenian international players

References

External links

1967 births
Living people
Sportspeople from Koper
Yugoslav footballers
Slovenian footballers
Association football midfielders
Slovenian expatriate footballers
FC Koper players
NK Olimpija Ljubljana (1945–2005) players
NK Mura players
ND Gorica players
Slovenian PrvaLiga players
Cypriot First Division players
APOEL FC players
NK Primorje players
NK Rudar Velenje players
SK Rapid Wien players
Austrian Football Bundesliga players
Yokohama Flügels players
Slovenian expatriate sportspeople in Japan
Slovenian expatriate sportspeople in Austria
Slovenian expatriate sportspeople in Cyprus
Expatriate footballers in Japan
Expatriate footballers in Austria
Expatriate footballers in Cyprus
Slovenia international footballers
Slovenian football managers